Onoulphus, also Onoulf, Unulf and Hunulf (died 493) was a general of the late fifth century of Scirian origin. He served as magister militum per Illyricum from 477 to 479 as a general of the Eastern Roman Empire, then afterwards was a general for his brother Odoacer, king of Italy, until their death.

Biography 
Onoulphus was a Scirian; with his brother (or possibly half-brother), Odoacer, he was raised at the court of Attila, King of the Huns. Following the destruction of the Sciri, who had been incited to break their treaty with the Ostrogoths by Hunimund, king of the Swabians, Onoulphus with his father Edeko joined the Swabian side in the Battle of Bolia in the late 460s, where they were again defeated by the Ostrogoths under their king Theodemir.

Onoulphus joined the Roman army in the 470s and rose through its ranks. He found a protector in the general Armatus, who had him appointed first comes and in 477, magister militum per Illyricum, commander in chief of the Balkan army. In that same year, by order of the Emperor Zeno, Onoulphus killed Armatus, despite his having greatly benefited by the latter's protection (sources states that Armatus lent him a huge sum to pay for a banquet).

Onoulphus kept his office until 479, when he fell out of favour. He then found refuge with his brother Odoacer, who by then had become king of Italy. One of the duties he carried out for his brother was a campaign against Fredericus, who had succeeded his father Feletheus as king of the Rugians.  Onoulphus found it necessary to evacuate the remaining Romans and resettled them in Italy. The remaining Rugians fled and took refuge with the Ostrogoths; the abandoned province was settled by the Lombards by 493.

He remained loyal to Odoacer during his brother's war for survival against Theodoric the Great, king of the Ostrogoths, standing with him during the siege of Ravenna. After Odoacer's death, Onoulphus was killed by archers while seeking refuge in a church.

Connection between Onoulphus, Odoacer and Armatus 

A recent publication by Stephan Krautschick advanced the hypothesis that Armatus and his cousin and emperor Basiliscus were related by blood with the chieftain of the Heruli and later King of Italy Odoacer. According to this hypothesis, supported by several scholars, Armatus was the brother of Onoulphus and Odoacer, who, therefore, was the nephew of Emperor Basiliscus and of his sister, the Empress Verina, wife of Emperor Leo I. This hypothesis explains why Armatus generously helped Onoulphus in his career, and states that he was killed by his own brother.

The connection between Armatus, Odoacer and Onoulphus is given by a fragment in the chronicle of John of Antioch, in which Onoulphus is said to be the killer and the brother of Armatus. Before Krautschick's hypothesis, and still today for scholars who reject this identification, John's passage was corrected to read "Odoacer was the brother of that Onoulphus who killed Armatus": this correction makes the statement compatible with those of the contemporary historians, as neither John Malalas nor Malchus tell about the relationship between Odoacer and Basiliscus or the killing of Armatus by his own brother.

Notes

Bibliography 
 
 Alexander Demandt, Die Spätantike: römische Geschichte von Diocletian bis Justinian 284-565 n. Chr., 1989, Munchen, p. 178.
 Krautschick, Stephan, "Zwei Aspekte des Jahres 476", Historia, 35, 1986, pp. 344–371.
 
 Rohrbacher, David, The Historians of Late Antiquity, Routledge, 2002, pp. 82–92.

493 deaths
5th-century Romans
Germanic warriors
Sciri
Huns
Comites
Magistri militum
Year of birth unknown